Russian basketball clubs in European and worldwide competitions is the performance record of men's professional basketball clubs from Russia's various top-tier level leagues over the years, Super Liga A (1991–92 to 2009–10), Professional Basketball League (PBL) (2010–11 to 2012–13), and the VTB United League (2013–14 to present).

After the 2022 Russian invasion of Ukraine, FIBA banned Russian teams and officials from participating in FIBA 3x3 Basketball competitions.

History
Russian men's professional basketball clubs have played in European-wide basketball competitions since September 1992 (nine months after the dissolution of the Soviet Union on December 26, 1991), when CSKA Moscow took part in the FIBA European League (now called EuroLeague), Stroitel Samara in the FIBA European Cup and Avtodor Saratov in the FIBA Korać Cup. UNICS Kazan is the first Russian men's basketball club that won a European-wide competition trophy, the 2003–04 FIBA Europe League (now called EuroChallenge), a third-tier competition on the pyramid of European professional club basketball system. CSKA Moscow was also the first Russian men's basketball club that won the EuroLeague, in 2006, when the club beat the defending champions, Maccabi Tel Aviv, in the Finals, that took place in Prague, Czech Republic.

The same season (2005–06), a few days before the EuroLeague Final Four in Prague, Dynamo Moscow, under head coach Dušan Ivković, became the second Russian basketball club that won a European-wide competition trophy, after the defeated Aris TT Bank in the final of the ULEB Cup (now called EuroCup Basketball) in Spiroudome, Charleroi, Belgium. For the next decade, Russian basketball clubs won many trophies in all European-wide competitions.

After the 2022 Russian invasion of Ukraine, FIBA banned Russian teams and officials from participating in FIBA 3x3 Basketball competitions.

The finals

EuroLeague (1st-tier)

Season to season

FIBA Saporta Cup (2nd-tier)

Season to season

FIBA Korać Cup (3rd-tier)

Season to season

See also
European basketball clubs in European and worldwide competitions from:
 Croatia
 Czechoslovakia
 France
 Greece
 Israel
 Italy
 Spain
 Turkey
 USSR
 Yugoslavia

References

Basketball in Russia